Andersson's leaf-toed gecko (Hemidactylus laticaudatus) is a species of gecko. It is endemic to northern Ethiopia and Eritrea.

References

Hemidactylus
Reptiles described in 1910
Reptiles of Ethiopia
Vertebrates of Eritrea
Taxa named by Lars Gabriel Andersson